is a Japanese retail store founded in 1663 as a pharmacy. It specializes in traditional Japanese paper goods, incense, Asian calligraphy supplies and books. From 1891 to 1945, it was the official stationer to the Imperial House of Japan. Its headquarters and first store are in Shimogyō-ku, Kyoto, while there are branch stores in Tokyo at Ginza, Ikebukuro, Shibuya, Shinjuku, Marunouchi, and Yokohama.

See also 
List of oldest companies

External links 
 
Time Out article in English

Retail companies of Japan
Retail companies established in 1663
Japanese stationery
Art materials brands
Japanese incense companies
Japanese brands
Companies based in Kyoto
1663 establishments in Japan